The Yerwa Kanuri are a Kanuri subgroup alongside manga Kanuri that live in Nigeria, Cameroon, Chad, Niger and Sudan. They speak Central Kanuri, a Nilo-Saharan language. The population numbers several million. Most Yerwa Kanuri are Muslims and farmers. They are also traditionally sheep and cattle herders.

References 

Ethnic groups in Nigeria
Ethnic groups in Sudan
Ethnic groups in Cameroon
Ethnic groups in Chad
Ethnic groups in Niger
Muslim communities in Africa